Joseph Sheehy may refer to:

 Joseph Warren Sheehy (1910–1967), American judge 
 Joseph Aloysius Sheehy (1900–1971), Australian judge